The 2017 Colorado State Rams football team represented Colorado State University during the 2017 NCAA Division I FBS football season. The Rams were led by third-year head coach Mike Bobo and played their home games at the newly built Sonny Lubick Field at Colorado State Stadium in Fort Collins, Colorado as members of the Mountain Division of the Mountain West Conference. They finished the season 7–6, 5–3 in Mountain West play to finish in a tie for second place in the Mountain Division. They were invited to the New Mexico Bowl where they lost to Marshall.

Previous season 
The Rams finished the 2016 season 7–6, 5–3 in Mountain West play to finish in a tie for fourth place in the Mountain Division. They were invited to the Famous Idaho Potato Bowl where they lost to Idaho.

Preseason 
In the preseason media poll that was revealed at the Mountain West Media Summit on July 25, 2017, the Rams were picked to finish second in the Mountain Division behind Boise State. WR Michael Gallup and OL Jake Bennett Mountain West Football Preseason All-Conference Team.

Schedule
Colorado State announced their 2017 football schedule on March 2, 2017.

Source:

Game summaries

Oregon State

vs Colorado

Abilene Christian

at Alabama

at Hawaii

at Utah State

Nevada

at New Mexico

Air Force

at Wyoming

Boise State

San Jose State

vs Marshall

Roster

Source:

Players in the 2018 NFL Draft

References

Colorado State
Colorado State Rams football seasons
Colorado State Rams football